Venediktos Printesis (Greek: Βενέδικτος Πρίντεζης; February 10, 1917 – October 21, 2008) was a Greek Bishop of the Roman Catholic Church.

Biography

Printesis was born in Manna, Syros in February 1917, and was ordained a priest on March 23, 1940. He served as a parish priest until he was appointed Archbishop of the Archdiocese of Athens on May 15, 1959. He was ordained a bishop June 21, 1959. Venediktos resigned as Archbishop on November 17, 1972.

References

External links
Catholic Hierarchy
gcatholic.org

1917 births
2008 deaths
Participants in the Second Vatican Council
People from Ermoupoli
Roman Catholic archbishops of Athens